The following is a list of artists who have reached number one on the adult contemporary music singles chart in Billboard magazine since the chart's inception in 1961. The chart has gone by a variety of names over the years, including Easy Listening, Pop Standard, Middle-Road, and the current Adult Contemporary.

A

B

C

D

E

F

G

H

I
 Enrique Iglesias (1)
 Janis Ian (1)
 Frank Ifield (1)
 James Ingram (2)
 Ronald Isley (1)
 Burl Ives (1)

J

K

L

M

N

O

P

Q–R

S

T–V

W–Z

Adult Contemporary